The 2006 World Women's Curling Championship (branded as 2006 Ford World Women's Curling Championship for sponsorship reasons) was held March 18–26 at the Canada Games Arena in Grande Prairie, Alberta, Canada.

Sweden, skipped by Anette Norberg, fresh off winning a gold medal at the 2006 Winter Olympics, defeated the United States, skipped by Debbie McCormick in the final, 10–9. Norberg won the game by making a draw in the 10th end. It was the second of three world championships for Norberg.

Teams
{| class="wikitable"
!bgcolor="#efefef" width="250"|
!bgcolor="#efefef" width="250"|
!bgcolor="#efefef" width="250"|
|-
|Kelowna CC, Kelowna 
Skip: Kelly Scott 
Third: Jeanna Schraeder 
Second: Sasha Carter 
Lead: Renee Simons 
Alternate: Michelle Allen
|Harbin CC, Harbin 
Skip: Wang Bingyu 
Third: Yue Qingshuang 
Second: Liu Yin 
Lead: Zhou Yan 
Alternate: Sun Yue 
|Tårnby CC, Tårnby 
Skip: Madeleine Dupont 
Third: Camilla Jensen 
Second: Denise Dupont 
Lead: Angelina Jensen** 
Alternate: Charlotte Hedegård
|-
!bgcolor="#efefef" width="250"|
!bgcolor="#efefef" width="250"|
!bgcolor="#efefef" width="250"|
|-
|SC Riessersee, Garmisch-Partenkirchen 
Skip: Andrea Schöpp 
Third: Monika Wagner 
Second: Anna Hartelt 
Lead: Marie Rotter 
Alternate: Tina Tchatschke
|New Wave CC, Cortina d'Ampezzo 
Skip: Diana Gaspari 
Third: Giulia Lacedelli 
Second: Rosa Pompanin 
Lead: Violetta Caldart 
Alternate: Arianna Lorenzi
| Karuizawa CC, Karuizawa 
Skip: Yukako Tsuchiya 
Third: Junko Sonobe 
Second: Tomoko Sonobe 
Lead: Chiemi Kameyama 
Alternate: Mitsuki Satoh
|-
!bgcolor="#efefef" width="250"|
!bgcolor="#efefef" width="250"|
!bgcolor="#efefef" width="250"|
|-
|CC Utrecht, Utrecht
Skip: Shari Leibbrandt-Demmon 
Third: Ellen van der Cammen 
Second: Margrietha Voskuilen 
Lead: Erika Doornbos 
Alternate: Idske de Jong
|Snarøen CC, Oslo 
Skip: Dordi Nordby 
Third: Marianne Haslum 
Second: Camilla Holth 
Lead: Charlotte Hovring 
Alternate: Kristin Skaslien
|Dun CC, Montrose & Stirling  Ice Rink Sports Club, Stirling  
Skip: Kelly Wood 
Third: Lorna Vevers 
Second: Kim Brewster 
Lead: Lindsay Wood 
Alternate: Kerry Barr 
|-
!bgcolor="#efefef" width="250"|
!bgcolor="#efefef" width="250"|
!bgcolor="#efefef" width="250"|
|-
|Härnösands CK, Härnösand 
Skip: Anette Norberg 
Third: Eva Lund 
Second: Cathrine Lindahl 
Lead: Anna Svärd  
Alternate: Ulrika Bergman
|Dübendorf CC, DübendorfSkip: Silvana Tirinzoni 
Third: Sandra Attinger 
Second: Anna Neuenschwander 
Lead: Esther Neuenschwander 
Alternate: Carmen Schäfer
|Madison CC, Madison 
Skip: Debbie McCormick 
Third: Allison Pottinger 
Second: Nicole Joraanstad 
Lead: Natalie Nicholson 
Alternate: Caitlin Maroldo
|}

** Angelina Jensen skipped the Danish team until she suffered a miscarriage and had to return to Denmark. Fourth Madeleine Dupont was given skipping duties following Jensen's departure.

Round robin standings

Round robin results
Draw 1March 18, 14:30Draw 2March 18, 21:00Draw 3March 19, 09:00Draw 4March 19, 13:30Draw 5March 19, 18:30Draw 6March 20, 09:00Draw 7March 20, 14:00Draw 8March 20, 18:30Draw 9March 21, 09:00Draw 10March 21, 14:00Draw 11March 21, 18:30Draw 12March 22, 09:00Draw 13March 22, 14:00Draw 14March 22, 19:30 
Draw 15March 23, 10:30Draw 16March 23, 13:00Draw 17March 23, 18:30Playoffs

1 vs. 2 gameMarch 24, 13:003 vs. 4 gameMarch 24, 19:30 

SemifinalMarch 25, 09:30FinalMarch 26, 10:30''

Round-robin player percentages

References
General
 
Specific

World Women's Curling Championship
World Women's Championship
Sport in Grande Prairie
2006 in Canadian curling
Women's curling competitions in Canada
March 2006 sports events in Canada
2006 in Alberta
2006 in Canadian women's sports
Curling competitions in Alberta
International sports competitions hosted by Canada

de:Curling-Weltmeisterschaft 2006